Adam King (January 20, 1783 – May 6, 1835) was a Jacksonian member of the U.S. House of Representatives from Pennsylvania.

Early life
Johann Adam King was born in York, Pennsylvania on January 20, 1783.  He studied medicine in the University of Pennsylvania at Philadelphia and commenced practice in York.

Career
He edited and published the York Gazette from 1818 to 1835.  He served as clerk of the courts of York County, Pennsylvania, from 1818 to 1826.

On January 29, 1825, Dr. Adam King, Col. M.H.Spangler, and Jacob Spangler escorted Gilbert du Motier, marquis de La Fayette and his son George Washington Lafayette, who were touring America, to Harrisburg, Pennsylvania. They returned to York on February 2, where they were greeted by six military companies and large crowds of people hailing Lafayette.

King was elected to the Twentieth Congress and reelected as a Jacksonian to the Twenty-first and Twenty-second Congresses.  He was an unsuccessful candidate for reelection in 1832 to the Twenty-third Congress. King then resumed the practice of medicine.

Death
King died in York on May 6, 1835. He was interred at Prospect Hill Cemetery.

His obituary indicates that he died at home by suicide on May 6, 1835.  However, his tombstone reads: "Dr. Adam King January 20, 1783 – May 7, 1835 For 6 years (from Mar 4, 1827 – Mar 4, 1833) the deceased ably and honorably represented the county of York in the Congress of the U.S".

References

Sources

The Political Graveyard

1790 births
1835 deaths
1830s suicides
Suicides in Pennsylvania
Perelman School of Medicine at the University of Pennsylvania alumni
Physicians from Pennsylvania
Politicians from York, Pennsylvania
Jacksonian members of the United States House of Representatives from Pennsylvania
19th-century American politicians